The 2001–02 Argentine Primera División was the 111th season of top-flight football in Argentina. The season ran from August 17, 2001 to May 19, 2002.

Racing Club de Avellaneda won the Apertura (its 16th league title, after 35 years with no domestic championships) and River Plate the Clausura (32nd title) championships, while Belgrano (C) and Los Andes were relegated to the second division.

In continental cups, Copa Sudamericana replaced Copa Mercosur, last held in 2001.

Torneo Apertura

Top scorers

Torneo Clausura

Top scorers

Relegation

Relegation table

Promotion Playoffs

Broadcasting rights

Television  
NexTV! and RedeTV! only are broadcast live called El Partido del Viernes on free-to-air TV each Friday at 21:00 (K.O 21:10) with production from the Torneos y Competencias.

See also
2001–02 in Argentine football

Notes

References

Argentine Primera División seasons
2001–02 in Argentine football leagues